Perur  is an ancient village in the State of Telangana , India. It is in the Nalgonda district. Perur is the place of Lord "Swayambhu Someswara swami", this temple of Lord Shiva is a place of traditional worship and treated as very auspicious and powerful.

One can reach Haliya from the towns Nalgonda, Miryalaguda or Nagarjuna Sagar.

The village is surrounded by paddy firms and small lakes. Its rich greenery and water sources allow people here to celebrate Shivaratri, Sankranti, Dasera and Batukamma in a very special and grand way.

It has a pond called SOMASAMUDHRAM which provides water for irrigation purpose for more than 300 acer's to the villages of Perur, pullareddy gudem & chelamareddy gudem.

The Temple

The Swayambhu Someswara temple is very ancient, and the Shiva Lingam is the "self incarnation" of Lord Shiva. Thus the name "Swayam Bhu Someswara".
Late Sri. Katakam Shankara Sharma of this village installed the temple and its Dhwaja Stambham in 1950s. The erection of Dhwaja Stambham was an all-village event and everyone participated with devotion.

On Shiva Ratri, the temple has special poojas including Abhishekam. Its treated similar to Srisailam Temple. There will be a Jaatara for about 3 days and also special attractions like "Edla pandem" ("bullock cart competitions") "Gundu pandem" and "kabaddi".

The temple construction is a work of art, especially the Nandi, which is situated at the door of the Garbha Gudi. The artwork on the pillars of the temple depicts important chapters of Ramayana.

Lord Ganesha's Vigraham is a unique one here, as the head of the god is exactly as the Elephant and is one of its kind. The temple has a "Jammi" plant on its left side which is treated as auspicious due to its age and placement. The temple has a "Kolanu", just opposite to the dhwaja Stambham, which was used by devotees for bath before the offerings.
Recently The Big "Nandi"  Statue is constructed in front of the Temple. And make an event (yathra) at the time shivarathri,dussera and karthika pournami by Janapati vamsha's from so many years .

Other information

There is a Ramalayam in the village. It is also very famous. Every year Sriramanavami is celebrated here very grandly. Another temple Lord Hanuman also there in the village..

Perur's sister towns are "Madhar Gudem" and "Anjaneya Tanda", " Pulla Reddy Gudem", "Veerlagadda Thanda".

Perur is also pronounced as Peroor.

Villages in Nalgonda district
Mandal headquarters in Nalgonda district